Charles Schagrin Building is a historic commercial building located at Wilmington, New Castle County, Delaware. It was built in the first quarter of the 19th century, with a new facade added in 1918, and modified again in 1948. It is a three-story, single bay commercial building with a rectangular plan built of wall bearing brick construction.  It features a recessed display window, vertical black granite strips on both sides of the building, a stuccoed sign framed by horizontal copper bands, a large single-light central window with a stepped concrete window frame, and is in the Art Deco style.

It was added to the National Register of Historic Places in 1985.

References

Commercial buildings on the National Register of Historic Places in Delaware
Art Deco architecture in Delaware
Commercial buildings completed in 1918
Buildings and structures in Wilmington, Delaware
National Register of Historic Places in Wilmington, Delaware
1918 establishments in Delaware